John Rogers (12 August 1651 – 10 February 1703) was an English  academic.

Rogers was born at Leatherhead and was educated at Magdalen College, Oxford, of which college he was a fellow from 1675  to 1701. He was Magdalen's President from 1701 until his death in Oxford.

References

1651 births
1703 deaths
People from Leatherhead
Alumni of Magdalen College, Oxford
Fellows of Magdalen College, Oxford
Presidents of Magdalen College, Oxford